Index–Alexia Alluminio was an Italian cycling team, active between 2000 and 2002. The team won the 2002 Giro d'Italia with Paolo Savoldelli.

Major wins

2000
 GP d'Europe, Dario Andriotto
 Memorial Cecchi Gori, Stage 1 (Chianciano), Oscar Cavagnis
 Tour de Beauce, Stage 3 (Mt Megantic), Stefano Della Santa
  National Championship, Serguei Outschakov
 GP Città di Rio Saliceto e Correggio, Eddy Serri
 Six Days of Berlin, Marco Villa
2001
 Giro Riviera Ligure Pomente, Stage 1 (Alassio), Daniele Galli
 Freccia dei Vini - Memorial Dott. Luigi Raffele Damiano Giannini
 Six Days of Fiorenzuola d'Arda, Ivan Quaranta and Marco Villa
 Giro d'Italia
 Stage 5 (Nettuno), Ivan Quaranta
 Stage 16 (Parma), Ivan Quaranta
 Ronde van Nederland, Stage 3 (Denekamp), Ivan Quaranta
 Settimana Ciclistica Internazionale Coppi-Bartali, Stage 1 (Ferrara), Ivan Quaranta
 Six Days of Turin, Marco Villa and Ivan Quaranta
 Tour de Langkawi, Stage 7 (Klang), Ivan Quaranta
 Six Days of Stuttgart, Marco Villa
2002
 Dwars door Gendringen, Ivan Quaranta
 Postgirot Open, Stage 5 (Göteborg), Ivan Quaranta
 Regio-Tour, Stage 2a (Müllheim), Ivan Quaranta
 Tour of Qatar, Stage 1 (Doha), Ivan Quaranta
 Tour de Langkawi, Stage 8 (Petaling Jaya), Antonio Salomone
 Giro d'Italia
Overall, Paolo Savoldelli
 Six Days of Amsterdam, Marco Villa
 Six-Days of Grenoble , Marco Villa
 Six Days of Turin, Marco Villa and Ivan Quaranta

References

Defunct cycling teams based in Italy
Cycling teams based in Italy
Cycling teams established in 2000
Cycling teams disestablished in 2002